Ronald S. Jarmin (born October 31, 1964) is an American economist who served as the acting director of the United States Census Bureau from January 20, 2021 to January 5, 2022. He currently serves as the deputy director and previously served as the chief operating officer of the bureau. He also served as acting director from 2017 to 2019 following the resignation of former director John H. Thompson.

Biography
Jarmin earned a B.A. from Central Washington University in 1987 and a PhD from the University of Oregon in 1992, both in economics. Since joining the Census Bureau in 1992 he has held various positions including Chief of the Center for Economic Studies, Chief Economist, and Associate Director for Economic Programs.

Jarmin led the team for the 2017 Economic Census, overseeing a move to 100 percent Internet data collection   and leveraging enterprise investments to minimize system, application and dissemination costs. Data products from the Economic Census provide the foundation for key measures of economic performance, including the nation's gross domestic product.

An elected Fellow of the American Statistical Association, he has published papers in the areas of industrial organization, business dynamics, entrepreneurship, technology and firm performance, urban economics, data access and statistical disclosure avoidance.

References

External links
 

1964 births
Living people
20th-century American economists
21st-century American economists
United States Census Bureau people
Central Washington University alumni
University of Oregon alumni
Fellows of the American Statistical Association
Trump administration personnel
Biden administration personnel